British N gauge is a model railway scale and gauge, rolling stock is to a scale of 1:148, track is  width as with all other N gauges making track and rolling stock approximately 10% out of scale with respect to each other. The  track width derives from a scale of 1:160 for  rails.

Background
When N gauge was developed it proved impossible to fit the then available motors into scale models of British prototype locomotives. British railways use a smaller loading gauge than those in Europe and America, resulting in smaller locomotives. A greater body size was required on the models to accommodate the motors, so instead of adopting the correct 1:160 scale, 1:148 was used. This allows larger models, but means that the gauge is not an accurate representation of standard gauge. A similar problem and solution was adopted with OO gauge and British TT gauge in Britain. However, since N scales to  gauge, it is less out of scale than OO or TT3 in representing the  standard gauge.

Manufacturers
Graham Farish is the most prolific manufacturer, producing British locomotives, rolling stock and buildings.
Peco manufactures track and British outlined buildings in kit form and rollingstock.
Dapol produces locomotives and rolling stock.
Fleischmann produces track locomotives and rolling stock etc.
Other companies produce kits for buildings, rolling stock and other parts - including Metcalfe models, Ratio, P&D Marsh and others.
CJM Models produce hand built models of locomotives and other rolling stock.

Former manufacturers
Minitrix/Hornby - prior to being taken over by Märklin Minitrix produced British outline rolling stock and locomotives, which were sold in association with Hornby.
Lima - Produced some rolling stock and locomotives
Hornby produced British outline buildings in N gauge as part of its Lyddle End range.

Related scales

Finescale modellers modelling in this size use 2mm finescale, which has 9.42mm track and a scale of 1:152.

References

External links
N Gauge Forum N Gauge Community.
British N gauge resource Lists of post steam UK rolling stock produced in N gauge. ngauge.org.uk
N Gauge Society
UK N Gauge news

2 mm scale